Microbial art, agar art, or germ art is artwork created by culturing microorganisms in certain patterns. The microbes used can be bacteria, yeast, fungi, or less commonly, protists. The microbes can be chosen for their natural colours, or can be engineered to express fluorescent proteins and viewed under ultraviolet light to make them fluoresce in colour.

Methods

Agar plates are used as a canvas, while pigmented or fluorescent bacteria and yeasts represent the paint. In order to preserve a piece of microbial art after a sufficient incubation, the microbe culture is sealed with epoxy.

Microbe species can be chosen for their natural colours to form a palette for the artwork. Suitable species of bacteria (with their colours) include Bacillus subtilis (cream to brown), Chromobacterium violaceum (violet), Escherichia coli (colourless), Micrococcus luteus (yellow), Micrococcus roseus (pink), Proteus mirabilis, Pseudomonas aeruginosa (brown), Pseudomonas fluorescens (naturally blue-green fluorescent with pyoverdine), Serratia marcescens (pink or orange), Staphylococcus aureus (yellow), and Vibrio fischeri (bioluminescent).

Yeast species – which are fungi – used include Saccharomyces cerevisiae (yellow-white) Aspergillus flavus (yellow-green spores), Aspergillus ochraceus (yellow), Aureobasidium pullulans (black), Candida albicans (whitish buff), Candida sake, Candida sp. (whitish), Cladosporium herbarum (brown to black), Cladosporium resinae, Epicoccum nigrum (yellow, orange, red, brown, and black), Fusarium sp., Rhodotorula sp., and Scopulariopsis brevicaulis.

Protist species used include Euglena gracilis (photosynthetic, green) and Physarum polycephalum (yellow-green).

A technique called "bacteriography" involves selectively killing certain areas of a bacterial culture with radiation, in order to produce artistic patterns. After incubation, the culture is sealed with acrylic.

The type of medium in the agar plates is also important. Chromagar Candida is a differential medium that is used to identify different Candida species. When grown on this medium, C. albicans is light green, C. tropicalis is steel blue with purple around the edges, and C. krusei is rose pink with white around the edges. However, using a different medium, C. tropicalis has maroon colonies. The color of the medium itself can also be changed using microbes. In TCBS agar, Bromthymol Blue and Thymol Blue turn yellow when the pH decreases, such as when bacteria consume sucrose. In this way, the background color of the medium can be changed from dark green to light yellow.

Artists
Alexander Fleming, who is commonly credited with the discovery of penicillin in 1928, was known for creating germ paintings. Throughout his career, Fleming’s paintings became more colorful as he came to know more microbial species. He would incorporate them into his paintings of ballerinas, families, and other images. Some of his patients would even pay him in painting lessons.

The biochemist Roger Tsien won the 2008 Nobel prize for chemistry for his contributions to knowledge of green fluorescent protein (GFP) that has been used to create art-like works.

Agar Art Competition

The American Society for Microbiology hosts an annual contest for microbial art: Agar Art. The contest was organized after a picture from a Christmas tree, made by Rositsa Tashkova, went viral in 2014.  The 2015 edition covered 85 submissions, of which microbial art created by Mehmet Berkmen and Maria Peñil called Neurons won first place. The artwork used yellow Nesterenkonia and orange Deinococcus and Sphingomonas.

In 2020, the ASM received over 200 submissions, and awarded first place to Joanne Dungo for her multi-plate creation titled “The Gardener.”

See also
 BioArt
 Microbes in human culture
 Mold painting
 Fungi in Art

Notes

References

External links

 Microbial art collection
 National Geographic article on microbial art
 2019 agar art winners

Visual arts media
Microbiology